The 2015–16 Calgary Flames season was the 36th season in Calgary and 44th in the National Hockey League (NHL) for the Flames franchise. Coming off an unexpected run to the second round of the Stanley Cup playoffs in 2014–15, and having acquired defenceman Dougie Hamilton and forward Michael Frolik in the off-season, the Flames were expected to again compete for a playoff spot in 2015–16. Instead, the team struggled. Calgary missed the playoffs and spent much of the season languishing near the bottom of the NHL standings. Defenceman Dennis Wideman had a difficult season individually as he became embroiled in controversy after striking linesman Don Henderson after himself suffering a concussion during a game. The NHL suspended Wideman for 20 games for abuse of an official, prompting a pair of appeals from the National Hockey League Players' Association (NHLPA). The second appeal, to a neutral arbitrator, found that the suspension was excessive, and reduced it to ten games, though Wideman had already missed 19 contests when the ruling was made.

Off-season
Calgary entered the 2015 NHL Entry Draft holding the 15th overall selection in the first round, but sent that pick (along with a pair of second-rounders) to the Boston Bruins in exchange for 22-year-old defenceman Dougie Hamilton in a draft-day trade. The acquisition of Hamilton solidified a Calgary defence that includes captain Mark Giordano, T. J. Brodie, Dennis Wideman and Kris Russell – all of whom scored at least 34 points in 2014–15 – and which The Hockey News called "one of the most complete" defensive units in the league. The Flames added to their forward ranks on the first day of the free agent signing period by agreeing to a five-year, $21 million contract with Michael Frolik, formerly of the Winnipeg Jets.

The Flames were widely predicted to be among the worst teams in the NHL in 2014–15. The team defied the predictions and reached the second round of the playoffs following a third-place finish in the Pacific Division.  As a consequence of that season, Calgary entered 2015–16 with dramatically higher expectations. The Hockey News predicted the Flames would again finish third in the Pacific, behind the Anaheim Ducks and Los Angeles Kings, and qualify for the 2016 Stanley Cup playoffs.

Regular season

October – December 
The Flames began the season without T. J. Brodie, who suffered a broken hand during a pre-season game and was expected to miss as much as six weeks. Injuries to Lance Bouma (leg), and Micheal Ferland (knee), followed early in the season. On the ice, the team struggled in October. The Flames lost their season and home opener 5–1 against the Vancouver Canucks on October 7. Though the Flames defeated the Canucks in the return match-up three nights later, Calgary then lost 9 of their following 11 games to start the year with just three wins against nine regulation losses and an overtime loss. The poor start forced the team into a position where they would have to make recent NHL history in order to qualify for the 2016 Stanley Cup playoffs. No team since the introduction of the shootout in 2005–06 had qualified for the post-season after earning only seven or fewer points in their first 13 games.

The Flames improved marginally in November, as the team won five of its following eight games, including all four played on home ice in the month. However, a late November road trip that ended in losses to the Anaheim Ducks, Arizona Coyotes and San Jose Sharks resulted in Calgary entering December with only eight wins and 18 points on the season.  The loss to the Ducks away in Anaheim was particularly frustrating for the team as they held 2–0 and 3–2 leads before dropping a 5–3 decision. It was the 21st consecutive regular season loss for the team at the Honda Center, a streak that dates back to January 19, 2004. Much of the team's struggles were attributed to the Flames' poor special teams, as Calgary sat last in the NHL in both the Power play and on the penalty kill. Consequently, the Flames sat dead last in the NHL standings by early December.

A five-game home stand to begin December reversed the team's fortunes, as Calgary won all five games and ran their home ice winning streak to nine. The Flames were led by their top players, as leading forwards Johnny Gaudreau and Sean Monahan, as well as top defencemen Mark Giordano and T. J. Brodie, combined for 12 goals and 16 assists during the homestand. The team's success was also driven by the team's prowess in the NHL's new three-on-three overtime format: The Flames won three games on the homestand in overtime (in addition to a shootout victory). The team's record in the overtime periods stood at a league-best seven wins in eight games decided in overtime, and Gaudreau led all NHL players in scoring with three goals and three assists. Opening a four-game road trip against the Nashville Predators on December 15, the Flames again won in overtime, and Gaudreau again recorded a point as he assisted on Kris Russell's winning tally. The victory pulled the Flames' record back to the .500 mark at 14–14–2. A 3–1 victory two nights later against the Dallas Stars elevated the team into a playoff position for the first time as they moved into third place in the Pacific Division. Calgary's overall winning streak ended at seven games on December 19 as the team fell 3–2 to the St. Louis Blues before ending the road trip with a 4–2 loss against the Detroit Red Wings. The Flames returned to the Saddledome for their final game before the Christmas break on December 22 and, led by Johnny Gaudreau's second hat trick of the season, defeated the Winnipeg Jets 4–1. It was Calgary's tenth consecutive win on home ice, which tied the franchise record set between November 7 and December 12, 2006.

The Flames broke the team record on December 27, as they recorded their 11th-straight home win with a 5–3 victory over the Edmonton Oilers. Gaudreau scored two goals in the contest, and with five in two games, was named both the NHL's First Star of the Week for December 21–27, and the league's First Star for the month of December. The home winning streak came to an end on December 29, as the Anaheim Ducks defeated Calgary 1–0; it was the Flames' first home ice loss in two months.  Calgary ended the year with another home loss, on December 31 to the Los Angeles Kings.

January – February
The Flames opened the new year with victories over the Colorado Avalanche and Tampa Bay Lightning before losing consecutive games to division rivals the Arizona Coyotes and San Jose Sharks. Calgary then scored a dominating 6–0 victory over the Florida Panthers on January 13; rookie Sam Bennett scored four goals in the contest. In so doing, he became the youngest player in Flames' history (19 years, six months) to record both a hat trick and a four-goal game, and the first Flame to score four since Jarome Iginla in 2003.  Bennett was named the league's Second Star for the week of January 11–17. The Flames struggled for the rest of the month as they won only one game on a five-game road trip, before returning home and losing to the Nashville Predators on January 27 in their final game before the All-Star break. With a record of 21–24–3. Calgary had fallen toward the bottom of the league standings. As the team entered the break, the Flames had fallen to sixth in the division and 12th place in the conference, and head coach Bob Hartley lamented the team's inconsistent play.

The Flames had two participants at the All-Star Game, played in Nashville: Mark Giordano and Johnny Gaudreau were named to the Pacific Division team and both played in their second consecutive All-Star Game. The pair helped the Pacific Division team win the four-team mini tournament and share a $1 million prize.

During the team's all-star break, the National Hockey League reviewed a controversial incident between defenceman Dennis Wideman and linesman Don Henderson in the Nashville game.  Wideman was checked hard by an opposing player partway through the first period and, as he slowly skated back to the Flames bench, collided with Henderson then pushed off the official with an apparent crosscheck. After the game, Wideman said he was distracted by pain in his neck and shoulder following the bodycheck he received and did not notice Henderson until it was too late to avoid a collision. The league reviewed the incident over the all-star break and, following a February 2 hearing, rejected Wideman's explanation and determined the collision was a deliberate abuse of an official. The league announced the following day that it had suspended Wideman for 20 games, the penalty described in the league rule book for "any player who deliberately strikes an official and causes injury or who deliberately applies physical force in any manner against an official with intent to injure". Wideman would also forfeit over $560,000 in salary due to the suspension. Both the Flames and Wideman expressed their disappointment in the severity of the suspension, while the National Hockey League Players' Association (NHLPA) immediately appealed it on Wideman's behalf. The NHLPA argued Wideman had no intention of colliding with or harming Henderson, and pointed to "medical evidence" presented in the disciplinary hearing regarding Wideman's condition at the time of the incident.

Further controversy arose for the Flames following the all-star break as Monahan, Gaudreau and Bouma were all held out of the lineup by head coach Bob Hartley for the team's February 9 game against the Toronto Maple Leafs. The trio were late for a team meeting the previous day, and were scratched from the Toronto game for disciplinary reasons. The decision allowed defenceman Jakub Nakladal to make his NHL debut in the game, a 4–3 victory. The trio returned to the lineup two nights later in a wild 6–5 shootout win over the San Jose Sharks, a game in which goaltender Karri Ramo suffered a serious left knee injury after being knocked into the goalpost. The injury was revealed to be a torn anterior cruciate ligament (ACL) and meniscus damage that ended his season. However, the team's playoff hopes were greatly diminished in the following two games – a 4–1 loss in Phoenix and a 6–4 defeat to Anaheim in a Family Day matinee at home on February 15 – and left the team ten points outside of a playoff spot.

March – April
Gary Bettman upheld Wideman's suspension on appeal, which prompted the NHLPA to further appeal to an independent arbitrator, the first time since the process was created in 2013 that the NHLPA had taken this step. The process was criticized for how slowly it moved, as Wideman had already served 19 games of his suspension when the arbitrator ruled against the NHL's position that Wideman intended to injure the official, and reduced his suspension to ten games. Consequently, he had $280,000 in salary returned for the time he should not have missed. Wideman's return to the Flames' lineup was short-lived as he suffered a season-ending triceps injury one week after being reinstated in a March 17 game.

On the ice the Flames continued to struggle. After losing eight of their final nine games in February, the Flames won only two of six games to begin March. The team enjoyed a 3–0–1 stretch that began on March 15 with a Michael Frolik hat trick in a 7–4 victory over the St. Louis Blues, and ended with goaltender Niklas Backstrom, acquired from the Minnesota Wild in a trade at the deadline, recording a 4–1 victory over Montreal in his first NHL contest in over a year on March 21.

The Flames were eliminated from post-season contention on March 26, prior to a 4–1 home defeat to Chicago. A few nights later, on March 30, Calgary tied the NHL record for most consecutive road losses to one team as they skated to their 23rd consecutive regular season defeat in Anaheim. However, in the 8–3 loss, Mark Giordano became the first Flames' defenceman to score 20 goals in one season since Dion Phaneuf in 2005–06, while rookie Hunter Shinkaruk scored his first NHL goal.

Standings

Schedule and results

Pre-season

Regular season

Player statistics

Skaters

Goaltenders

†Denotes player spent time with another organization before joining Flames. Stats reflect time with the Flames only.
‡Traded mid-season. Stats reflect time with the Flames only.

Awards and honours

Awards

Milestones

Transactions

Player signings

Trades

Additions and subtractions

Draft picks

Below are the Calgary Flames' selections at the 2015 NHL Entry Draft, to be held on June 26–27, 2015 at the BB&T Center in Sunrise, Florida.

 The Calgary Flames' first-round pick went to the Boston Bruins as the result of a trade on June 26, 2015, that sent Dougie Hamilton to Calgary in exchange for Calgary and Washington's second-round picks in 2015 (45th and 52nd overall) and this pick.
 The Calgary Flames' second-round pick went to the Boston Bruins as the result of a trade on June 26, 2015, that sent Dougie Hamilton to Calgary in exchange for a first-round pick in 2015 (15th overall), Washington's second-round pick in 2015 (52nd overall) and this pick.
 The Vancouver Canucks' second-round pick went to the Calgary Flames as the result of a trade on March 2, 2015, that sent Sven Baertschi to Vancouver in exchange for this pick.
 The Tampa Bay Lightning's second-round pick went to the Calgary Flames as the result of a trade on June 27, 2015, that sent Calgary and Washington's third-round picks both in 2015 (76th and 83rd overall) to Arizona in exchange for this pick. Arizona previously acquired this pick, as the result of a trade on March 1, 2015 that sent Keith Yandle, Chris Summers and a fourth-round pick in 2016 to New York in exchange for John Moore, Anthony Duclair, a conditional first-round pick in 2016 and this pick. The Rangers previously acquired this pick as the result of a trade March 5, 2014, that sent Ryan Callahan, a conditional first-round pick in 2014, a first-round pick in 2015, and a conditional seventh-round pick in 2015 to Tampa Bay in exchange for Martin St. Louis and this pick (being conditional at the time of the trade). The condition – the Rangers will receive a second-round pick in 2015 if Callahan is re-signed by Tampa Bay for the 2014–15 NHL season – was converted on June 25, 2014, when Tampa Bay signed Callahan to a six-year contract.
 The Calgary Flames' third-round pick went to the Arizona Coyotes as the result of a trade on June 27, 2015, that sent Tampa Bay's second-round pick in 2015 (60th overall) to Calgary in exchange for Washington's third-round pick in 2015 (83rd overall) and this pick.
 The Calgary Flames' fourth-round pick went to the San Jose Sharks as the result of a trade on July 2, 2013, that sent TJ Galiardi to Calgary in exchange for this pick.

References

Calgary Flames seasons
Cal
Calgary